The Cricket on the Hearth: A Fairy Tale of Home is a novella by Charles Dickens, published by Bradbury and Evans, and released 20 December 1845 with illustrations by Daniel Maclise, John Leech, Richard Doyle, Clarkson Stanfield and Edwin Henry Landseer. Dickens began writing the book around 17 October 1845 and finished it by 1 December. Like all of Dickens's Christmas books, it was published in book form, not as a serial.

Dickens described the novel as "quiet and domestic [...] innocent and pretty." It is subdivided into chapters called "Chirps", similar to the "Quarters" of The Chimes or the "Staves" of A Christmas Carol. It is the third of Dickens's five Christmas books, preceded by A Christmas Carol (1843) and The Chimes (1844), and followed by The Battle of Life (1846) and The Haunted Man and the Ghost's Bargain (1848).

Background
In July 1845, Dickens contemplated forming a periodical focusing on the concerns of the home. It was to be called The Cricket, but the plan fell through, and he transformed his idea into a Christmas book in which he abandoned social criticism, current events, and topical themes in favour of simple fantasy and a domestic setting for his hero's redemption, though some have criticised this notion. The book was released on 20 December 1845 (the title page read "1846") and sold briskly into the New Year. Seventeen stage productions opened during the Christmas season 1845 with one production receiving Dickens's approval and opening on the same day as the book's release. Dickens read the tale four times in public performance. It has been dramatised in numerous languages and for years was more popular on stage than A Christmas Carol. Cricket is less explicitly Christian than some of Dickens's other Christmas books, and it has been criticised for its sentimentality, but contemporary readers were attracted to its depiction of the Victorian ideal of the happy home.

Plot
John Peerybingle, a carrier, lives with his young wife Dot, their baby boy and their nanny Tilly Slowboy. A cricket chirps on the hearth and acts as a guardian angel to the family. One day a mysterious elderly stranger comes to visit and takes up lodging at Peerybingle's house for a few days.

The life of the Peerybingles intersects with that of Caleb Plummer, a poor toymaker employed by the miser Mr. Tackleton. Caleb has a blind daughter Bertha, and a son Edward, who travelled to South America and is thought to be dead.

The miser Tackleton is now on the eve of marrying Edward's sweetheart, May, but she does not love Tackleton. Tackleton tells John Peerybingle that his wife Dot has cheated on him, and shows him a clandestine scene in which Dot embraces the mysterious lodger; the latter, who is in disguise, is actually a much younger man than he seems. John is cut to the heart over this as he loves his wife dearly, but decides after some deliberations to relieve his wife of their marriage contract.

In the end, the mysterious lodger is revealed to be none other than Edward who has returned home in disguise. Dot shows that she has indeed been faithful to John. Edward marries May hours before she is scheduled to marry Tackleton. However, Tackleton's heart is melted by the festive cheer (in a manner reminiscent of Ebenezer Scrooge), and he surrenders May to her true love.

Characters
 John Peerybingle, a carrier; a lumbering, slow, honest man
 Mrs. Mary Peerybingle, ("Dot"), John Peerybingle's wife
 Caleb Plummer, a poor old toymaker in the employ of Tackleton
 Bertha Plummer, the blind daughter of Caleb Plummer
 Edward Plummer, the son of Caleb Plummer
 Tackleton (called "Gruff and Tackleton"), a stern, ill-natured, sarcastic toy merchant
 May Fielding, a friend to Mrs. Peerybingle
 Mrs. Fielding, her mother; a little, peevish, querulous old lady
 Tilly Slowboy, a great clumsy girl; Mrs. Peerybingle's nursemaid
 the baby, child of Dot and John, treated as an object throughout the story.

Literary significance and criticism
The book was a huge commercial success, quickly going through two editions. Reviews were favourable, but not all so. In an unsigned piece in The Times the reviewer opined, "We owe it to literature to protest against this last production of Mr. Dickens [...] Shades of Fielding and Scott! Is it for such jargon as this that we have given your throne to one who cannot estimate his eminence?" However, William Makepeace Thackeray enjoyed the book immensely: "To us, it appears it is a good Christmas book, illuminated with extra gas, crammed with extra bonbons, French plums and sweetness [...] This story is no more a real story than Peerybingle is a real name!"

Dickens's portrayal of the blind girl Bertha is significant. Victorians believed disabilities were inherited, and thus it was not socially acceptable for the blind to marry (although they often did in reality). In fictional courtship plots, the blind were often used to build tension since it was assumed they must be kept from marrying. The fictional portrayal of Bertha is similar to Dickens's description in American Notes (1842) of the deaf and blind girl Laura Bridgman, whom he saw on a visit to the Perkins Institution for the Blind in Boston, Massachusetts.

Modern scholars have given the story little attention, but Andrew Sangers has argued it contains similarities to Shakespeare's comedies and should be seen "both as a significant indication of the tastes of the 1840s and of Dickens himself."

Vladimir Lenin left during a performance of the Cricket play in Russia, as he found it dull and the saccharine sentimentality got on his nerves. This incident might now be little remembered if George Orwell had not mentioned it in his essay on Dickens.

Adaptations

Stage adaptations include the successful The Cricket on the Hearth by Albert Richard Smith produced at the Surrey Theatre in 1845, and Dion Boucicault's Dot, A Drama in Three Acts (or simply Dot), first performed at New York's Winter Garden in 1859. It was staged repeatedly in Britain and America for the remainder of the 19th century, starring, at times, John Toole, Henry Irving, and Jean Davenport. The play helped launch the career of American actor Joseph Jefferson (1829–1905).

The novella was the basis for at least two operas: Karl Goldmark's Das Heimchem am Herd with a libretto by A. M. Willner (premiere: June 1896, Berlin; New York 1910), and Riccardo Zandonai's Il grillo del focolare with a libretto by Cesare Hanau (premiere: November 1908, Turin). Goldmark's opera was performed in Philadelphia in November 1912 with the Cricket sung by American soprano Mabel Riegelman (1889, Cincinnati – 1967, Burlingame, California).

Film, radio, and television adaptations include three American silent film versions: one, directed by D.W. Griffith (1909) starring Owen Moore, another directed by L. Marston (1914) starring Alan Hale, and one directed by Lorimer Johnston (1923). A silent Russian version, Sverchok na Pechi (1915) was directed by Boris Sushkevich and Aleksandr Uralsky and starred Maria Ouspenskaya. A silent French version, Le Grillon du Foyer (1922), was directed and adapted by Jean Manoussi and starred Charles Boyer as Edouard. A 25-minute NBC radio play adaptation aired on 24 December 1945.

In 1967, Rankin/Bass Productions produced a 50-minute animated television adaptation of the story for NBC. Told in the Cricket's own words, it featured the voices of Roddy MacDowall as the Cricket, and father and daughter Danny Thomas and Marlo Thomas as Caleb and Bertha, with various other characters voiced by Paul Frees and Hans Conried. This adaptation cuts several characters, including the central pair of John and Dot, focusing solely on Caleb and Bertha. Television Corporation of Japan (now Eiken) provided the animation for the special, while its seven original songs were written and composed by Maury Laws and Jules Bass. Rankin/Bass later produced their adaptations of Dickens's other holiday stories for television: A Christmas Tree (1850) as the ninth episode of their 1972–73 syndicated television series, Festival of Family Classics, and A Christmas Carol (1843) as the 1978 animated remake of the 1956 live action musical special, The Stingiest Man in Town.

See also
 List of Christmas-themed literature

Notes

External links

Online editions
The Cricket on the Hearth at Internet Archive.

The Cricket on the Hearth at Dickens Literature
 The Cricket on the Hearth at The University of Adelaide Library
 

Adaptations
Dot, A Drama in Three Acts by Dion Boucicault (1859)
Picture Gallery from Victorian Web

1845 British novels
British novellas
British novels adapted into films
British novels adapted into television shows
Christmas characters
Christmas novels
Fiction about insects
Fictional crickets
Novels adapted into operas
Novels by Charles Dickens
Novels set in London
Victorian novels